John Konchar (born March 22, 1996) is an American professional basketball player for the Memphis Grizzlies of the National Basketball Association (NBA). He played college basketball for the Purdue Fort Wayne Mastodons.

High school career 
Konchar played basketball for West Chicago High School in West Chicago, Illinois. In his junior season, he averaged 19.7 points, 8.8 rebounds, 3.4 assists, and two steals, leading his team in most statistical categories. They finished with a 5–22 record. On February 27, 2014, as a senior, Konchar posted 45 points, 15 rebounds, eight assists, five steals, and five blocks in an 89–82 win over St. Charles North High School. With the performance, he became his school's all-time leading scorer, surpassing his head coach and 1983 graduate Bill Recchia. Konchar averaged 28.9 points, 14.1 rebounds, 4.1 assists, 3.2 steals, and 2.5 blocks per game in his senior season, earning All-Area MVP honors. 

Despite his high school success, he was lightly recruited, with his only NCAA Division I scholarship offer coming from Chicago State. A Notre Dame assistant coach convinced Indiana University – Purdue University Fort Wayne (IPFW), then a joint campus of the Indiana University (IU) and Purdue University systems, to offer him a basketball scholarship. On April 25, 2015, he committed to IPFW.

College career 
During Konchar's college career, his basketball team represented two different universities and used three different athletic identities. In his freshman season, the school's athletic program was known as the IPFW Mastodons. Between his freshman and sophomore seasons, IPFW changed its athletic branding to Fort Wayne Mastodons. After his sophomore season, the IU and Purdue systems agreed to dissolve IPFW effective June 30, 2018. IPFW's degree programs in health sciences would transfer to the new Indiana University Fort Wayne, while all other IPFW degree programs, plus the IPFW athletic department, would become part of the new Purdue University Fort Wayne (PFW). Shortly before the split became official, the athletic department announced that it would henceforth be known as the Purdue Fort Wayne Mastodons.

On March 10, 2019, Konchar recorded 18 points, 10 rebounds, and 10 assists in a 96–70 victory over South Dakota in the 2019 Summit League tournament. It was the first triple-double in tournament history. As a senior for Purdue Fort Wayne, Konchar averaged 19.5 points, 8.6 rebounds, 5.4 assists, and two steals per game, earning first-team All-Summit League honors for his fourth consecutive season. He compiled 2,065 career points and left as the program's all-time leading scorer. At the end of the season, Tom Henry, mayor of Fort Wayne, Indiana, proclaimed March 28 as "John Konchar Day."

Professional career

Memphis Grizzlies (2019–present)
After going undrafted in the 2019 NBA draft, Konchar signed a two-way contract with the Memphis Grizzlies. Konchar made his NBA debut on November 9, 2019 against the Dallas Mavericks. He suffered a calf strain on November 15 and was sidelined for several weeks.

On November 22, 2020, the Grizzlies announced that they had re-signed Konchar to a multi-year contract. On May 11, 2021, Konchar logged a season-high 18 points on 7-of-10 shooting from the field and 2-of-4 from three along with six rebounds and three assists in 26 minutes of play in a 133–104 win over the Dallas Mavericks.

During the Grizzlies' regular season finale on April 10, 2022, Konchar recorded his first career triple-double with 17 points, ten assists and 13 rebounds in a 110–139 loss to the Boston Celtics.

On July 7, 2022, Konchar signed a 3-year, $19 million contract extension with the Grizzlies. On November 18, he scored a career-high 19 points, alongside ten rebounds and two assists, in a 121–110 win over the Oklahoma City Thunder.

Career statistics

NBA

Regular season

|-
| style="text-align:left;"| 
| style="text-align:left;"| Memphis
| 19 || 0 || 9.5 || .649 || .500 || .500 || 2.5 || 1.2 || .4 || .2 || 2.8
|-
| style="text-align:left;"| 
| style="text-align:left;"| Memphis
| 43 || 0 || 13.4 || .500 || .375 || .833 || 3.0 || 1.1 || .7 || .2 || 4.3
|-
| style="text-align:left;"| 
| style="text-align:left;"| Memphis
| 72 || 7 || 17.9 || .515 || .413 || .551 || 4.6 || 1.5 || .6 || .3 || 4.8
|- class="sortbottom"
| style="text-align:center;" colspan="2"| Career
| 134 || 7 || 15.3 || .522 || .407 || .654 || 3.8 || 1.3 || .6 || .3 || 4.4

Playoffs

|-
| style="text-align:left;"|2021
| style="text-align:left;"|Memphis
| 1 || 0 || 3.0 || .000 || .000 ||  || 1.0 || .0 || .0 || 1.0 || .0
|-
| style="text-align:left;"|2022
| style="text-align:left;"|Memphis
| 8 || 0 || 7.0 || .273 || .167 || 1.000 || 2.4 || .6 || .4 || .1 || 1.1
|- class="sortbottom"
| style="text-align:center;" colspan="2"| Career
| 9 || 0 || 6.6 || .250 || .143 || 1.000 || 2.2 || .6 || .3 || .2 || 1.0

Personal life 
Konchar is of Czech and Hungarian descent; in addition, his paternal grandfather is a Serb.

See also 
List of NCAA Division I men's basketball players with 2000 points and 1000 rebounds

References

External links 
Purdue Fort Wayne Mastodons bio
JohnKonchar.com

1996 births
Living people
American men's basketball players
American people of Czech descent
American people of Hungarian descent
American people of Serbian descent
Basketball players from Chicago
Memphis Grizzlies players
Memphis Hustle players
People from West Chicago, Illinois
Purdue Fort Wayne Mastodons men's basketball players
Shooting guards
Undrafted National Basketball Association players